Korean actress Kim Hye-soo has been recognized with multiple awards and nominations in film and television. She has won seven Baeksang Arts Awards ,five Blue Dragon Film Awards, one Grand Bell Awards— seven for Best Actress, and two for Best New Actress—since the first award in 1987 for her debut performance in Ggambo. Kim holds the record for the youngest actress to win Blue Dragon Film Award for Best Leading Actress for First Love (1993) at the age of 23. She has also won three times for her work in First Love (1993), Dr. Bong (1995), and Tazza: The High Rollers (2006), making her tie with Yoon Jeong-hee for the most awards for Blue Dragon Film Award for Best Leading Actress.

In 2005, Kim Hye-soo won Best Actress Award at both Baeksang Arts Awards and Grand Bell Awards, achieving the "Grand Slam" acting career for winning Best Actress Awards at three major Korean film awards (Baeksang, Grand Bell, and Blue Dragon). 

Kim consecutively won the MBC Drama Awards for Best Actress in 1995 and MBC Drama Awards for Grand Prize in 1996 for The Man of The Woman and Partner. She also won two KBS Drama Awards for Grand Prize in 2003 and 2013. Kim is the first and only actress to win three competitive Grand Prizes with different Drama Awards held by major Korean television networks. In addition, she won two Baeksang Arts Award for Best Actress for Oxtail Soup (1996) and Signal (2016).

Major awards

Asian Film Awards

Baeksang Arts Awards 
Baeksang Arts Film Awards

Baeksang Arts TV Awards

Blue Dragon Film Awards

Blue Dragon Series Awards

Grand Bell Awards

Critics awards

Asian Film Critics Association Awards

Buil Film Awards
The Buil Film Awards are presented in an annual award show hosted by the Busan Ilbo newspaper since 1958.

Chunsa Film Art Awards
The Chunsa Film Art Awards are annually presented by the Korean Film Directors' Association (DGK) since 1990.

Cine 21 Awards

Director's Cut Awards

Grimae Awards
The Grimae Awards are an annual award ceremony held by the Korean Television Producers Association (KDPS) since 1993.

KOFRA Film Awards

Korea Gold Awards Festival
The Korea Gold Awards Festival is an annual award show presented by the Korean Society of Cinematographers (KSC) in recognition of the technical achievements in Korean films since 1977. It added acting awards categories in 1993.

Korean Association of Film Critics Awards
The Korean Association of Film Critics Awards are presented annually since 1980 by the Korean Association of Film Critics (KAFC) recognizing excellence in films, both domestic and foreign.

Korean Film Actor's Association Awards

Korean Film Producers Association Awards

Max Movie Awards

Television Network Awards

KBS Drama Awards

MBC Drama Awards

SBS Drama Awards

tvN10 Awards

Other awards

Asian Academy Creative Awards

Asia Contents Awards

Asia-Pacific Producers Network Awards

APAN Star Awards

KBS Excellent Program Evaluation Awards

Korea Fashion Photographers Association

Dong-A TV Fashion Beauty Awards

Faro Island Film Festival (Korean and Japanese)

Hong Kong International Film Festival

Korea Best Dresser Swan Awards

Korean Film Awards

Korea Drama Awards

Korea Movie Star Awards

Korea Visual Arts Festival

Newport Beach Film Festival

Pyeongtaek Film Festival

Style Icon Awards

University Film Festival of Korea

Miscellaneous awards

Korea Culture and Entertainment Awards
Korea Culture and Entertainment Awards are an annual award show held by the Korea Entertainment Information Newspaper since 1992.

Kinolights Awards

State honors

Notes

References

Kim Hye-soo